Davison Army Airfield or Davison AAF  is a military use airport serving Fort Belvoir, in Fairfax County, Virginia, United States.

Gen. Donald Angus Davison.

The airfield provided support for Army One from 1957 to 1976 for presidents Dwight Eisenhower, John F. Kennedy, Lyndon Johnson, Richard Nixon, and Gerald Ford. Its role of support for the presidential helicopter ended in 1976 when responsibility for the helicopter was transferred entirely to the United States Marine Corps. The 12th Aviation Battalion (part of The Army Aviation Brigade, TAAB)  now operates Davison AAF and the Pentagon helicopter pad.. The battalions 18 UH-60 Blackhawks including 4 VH-60 models ("Gold Tops") is responsible  for priority regional transport for  US Army  and Pentagon senior leadership. 

The Civil Air Patrol National Capitol Wing uses a small tower for use during exercises and flights, and bases their 4 Cessna 172 and 182's there.

Facilities 
Davison AAF has one runway designated 14/32 with an asphalt surface measuring 5,618 by 74 feet (1,712 by 23 m).

References

External links 
 Aerial photo as of 10 April 2002 from USGS The National Map
 

Airports in Virginia
Buildings and structures in Fairfax County, Virginia
United States Army airfields
Transportation in Fairfax County, Virginia